Mount Ellis is the highest mountain, 2,330 m, of the Darwin Mountains, surmounting the northern edge of Midnight Plateau. Mapped by the Darwin Glacier Party of the CTAE (1956–58). Named for M.R. Ellis, engineer with the CTAE, who accompanied Sir Edmund Hillary to the South Pole.

Sources
Aadc-maps

Ellis